Dermomurex abyssicolus is a species of sea snail, a marine gastropod mollusk in the family Muricidae, the murex snails or rock snails.

Description
The length of the shell varies between 3 mm and 10 mm.

Distribution
This marine species occurs off West Florida, USA; the Bahamas, Guadeloupe and Brazil.

References

 Merle D., Garrigues B. & Pointier J.-P. (2011) Fossil and Recent Muricidae of the world. Part Muricinae. Hackenheim: Conchbooks. 648 pp. page(s): 223

External links
 

Gastropods described in 1865
Dermomurex